Phlebolepis is an extinct thelodont agnathan genus belonging to the family Phlebolepididae. Whole fossils are found in Late Silurian (Ludlow epoch) aged strata from Saaremaa, Estonia. Phlebolepis elegans was average-sized for a thelodont, 7 cm long.

References 

Thelodonti genera
Silurian fish of Europe
Fossils of Estonia